This page lists all described species of the spider family Mecysmaucheniidae accepted by the World Spider Catalog :

Aotearoa

Aotearoa Forster & Platnick, 1984
 A. magna (Forster, 1949) (type) — New Zealand

Chilarchaea

Chilarchaea Forster & Platnick, 1984
 C. quellon Forster & Platnick, 1984 (type) — Chile, Argentina

Mecysmauchenioides

Mecysmauchenioides Forster & Platnick, 1984
 M. nordenskjoldi (Tullgren, 1901) (type) — Chile, Argentina
 M. quetrihue Grismado & Ramírez, 2005 — Argentina

Mecysmauchenius

Mecysmauchenius Simon, 1884
 M. canan Forster & Platnick, 1984 — Chile
 M. chacamo Forster & Platnick, 1984 — Chile
 M. chapo Forster & Platnick, 1984 — Chile
 M. chepu Forster & Platnick, 1984 — Chile
 M. chincay Forster & Platnick, 1984 — Chile
 M. eden Forster & Platnick, 1984 — Chile
 M. fernandez Forster & Platnick, 1984 — Chile (Juan Fernandez Is.)
 M. gertschi Zapfe, 1960 — Chile, Argentina
 M. newtoni Forster & Platnick, 1984 — Chile
 M. osorno Forster & Platnick, 1984 — Chile, Argentina
 M. platnicki Grismado & Ramírez, 2005 — Chile
 M. puyehue Forster & Platnick, 1984 — Chile
 M. segmentatus Simon, 1884 (type) — Chile, Argentina, Falkland Is.
 M. termas Forster & Platnick, 1984 — Chile
 M. thayerae Forster & Platnick, 1984 — Chile, Argentina
 M. victoria Forster & Platnick, 1984 — Chile
 M. villarrica Forster & Platnick, 1984 — Chile

Mesarchaea

Mesarchaea Forster & Platnick, 1984
 M. bellavista Forster & Platnick, 1984 (type) — Chile

Semysmauchenius

Semysmauchenius Forster & Platnick, 1984
 S. antillanca Forster & Platnick, 1984 (type) — Chile

Zearchaea

Zearchaea Wilton, 1946
 Z. clypeata Wilton, 1946 (type) — New Zealand
 Z. fiordensis Forster, 1955 — New Zealand

References

Mecysmaucheniidae